The Al Zour Refinery is an oil refinery under construction in Kuwait. It is the largest refinery in the Middle East. It is an essential part of Kuwait Vision 2035. It is Kuwait's largest environmental friendly oil refinery. 

Al Zour Refinery is a Kuwait-China cooperation project under the Belt and Road Initiative.

History
The Kuwait National Petroleum Company (KNPC) first released plans to build what would have been the country's fourth oil refinery in May 2006 before construction was postponed in March 2008 due to political opposition. Two years later, however, the government re-approved construction and Kuwait Integrated Petroleum Industries Company was created to manage its operations after 2019.

Initial plan
The Kuwait National Petroleum Company released plans to construct the refinery in July 2007. In May 2008, it awarded construction contracts; the largest contracted was granted to a consortium of Japan's JGC Corporation and South Korea's GS Engineering & Construction, covering the installation of six distillation and atmospheric residue desulphurisation units, and diesel, naphtha, and kerosene hydrotreating plants. Korea's SK Engineering & Construction was charged with constructing the hydrogen plants, as well as the compression and sulphur recovery units; Daelim Industrial was to construct storage tanks; and Hyundai Engineering and Construction was to be responsible for the marine works. U.S. engineering and construction firm Fluor Corporation was awarded the offsites and utilities contract. KNPC announced that it would be operational in 2012 and that it planned on spending approximately $14 billion on the project.

Initial cancellation
In March 2009, the Kuwaiti government informed the contractors to halt construction, citing a drop in oil prices. Some investment analysts predicted the project's cancellation as early as December 2008. Furthermore, the project encountered political opposition by lawmakers who claimed that the government had not consulted the Central Tenders Committee before awarding contracts to foreign companies.

However, in June 2011, the Supreme Petroleum Council—Kuwait's oil agency—re-approved construction of the refinery in Al Ahmadi, Kuwait. Construction had been halted due to financial concerns and political wrangling, but the Oil Minister affirmed that Kuwait was indeed moving forward with the refinery that would be able to process 615,000 barrels of oil per day. The estimated cost is $14.5 billion, or 4 billion dinars. In May 2012 Kuwait's three existing refineries produced 930,000 barrels per day.

Relaunch
The Kuwait National Petroleum Company announced that it would relaunch a tender in June 2012. The revised project timeline aims for completion in June 2019. The majority of EPC contracts were issued to Fluor, Daewoo, Hyundai Heavy Industries, Tecnicas Reunidas, Sinopec, Hanwha Engineering and Construction, SK Engineering, Amec (Wood) and Saipem, amongst others. Kuwait Integrated Petroleum Industries Company was created to manage the operations.

See also
 Kuwait Vision 2035

References 

JGC Corporation
Oil refineries in Kuwait
Belt and Road Initiative